The 2021–22 Campbell Fighting Camels basketball team represented Campbell University in the 2021–22 NCAA Division I men's basketball season. The Fighting Camels, led by 9th-year head coach Kevin McGeehan, played their home games at Gore Arena in Buies Creek, North Carolina as members of the Big South Conference.

Previous season
The Fighting Camels finished the 2020–21 season 17–10, 11–6 in Big South play to finish in third place. They lost in the Championship of the Big South tournament to Winthrop.

Roster

Schedule and results 

|-
!colspan=12 style=| Exhibition

|-
!colspan=12 style=| Non-conference regular season

|-
!colspan=12 style=| Big South Conference regular season
|-

|-
!colspan=12 style=| Big South tournament

|-

Source

References

Campbell Fighting Camels basketball seasons
Campbell Fighting Camels
Campbell Fighting Camels basketball
Campbell Fighting Camels basketball